Dichloromethane (DCM or methylene chloride, methylene bichloride) is an organochlorine compound with the formula . This colorless, volatile liquid with a chloroform-like, sweet odour is widely used as a solvent. Although it is not miscible with water, it is slightly polar, and miscible with many organic solvents.

Occurrence
Natural sources of dichloromethane include oceanic sources, macroalgae, wetlands, and volcanoes.  However, the majority of dichloromethane in the environment is the result of industrial emissions.

Production
DCM is produced by treating either chloromethane or methane with chlorine gas at 400–500 °C. At these temperatures, both methane and chloromethane undergo a series of reactions producing progressively more chlorinated products.  In this way, an estimated 400,000 tons were produced in the US, Europe, and Japan in 1993.

The output of these processes is a mixture of chloromethane, dichloromethane, chloroform, and carbon tetrachloride as well as hydrogen chloride as a byproduct. These compounds are separated by distillation.

DCM was first prepared in 1839 by the French chemist Henri Victor Regnault (1810–1878), who isolated it from a mixture of chloromethane and chlorine that had been exposed to sunlight.

Uses
DCM's volatility and ability to dissolve a wide range of organic compounds makes it a useful solvent for many chemical processes.  In the food industry, it is used to decaffeinate coffee and tea as well as to prepare extracts of hops and other flavourings. Its volatility has led to its use as an aerosol spray propellant and as a blowing agent for polyurethane foams.

Hydrogen bonding
Methylene chloride is a Lewis acid that can hydrogen bond to electron donors.  It is classified as a hard acid and is included in the ECW model.  It is a solvent that has been used in many thermodynamic studies of donor-acceptor bonding. The donor hydrogen-bonding corrections of methylene chloride in these thermodynamic studies has been reported.

Specialized uses

The chemical compound's low boiling point allows the chemical to function in a heat engine that can extract mechanical energy from small temperature differences. An example of a DCM heat engine is the drinking bird. The toy works at room temperature. It is also used as the fluid in jukebox displays and holiday bubble lights that have a colored bubbling tube above a lamp as a source of heat and a small amount of rock salt to provide thermal mass and a nucleation site for the phase changing solvent.

DCM chemically welds certain plastics. For example, it is used to seal the casing of electric meters. Often sold as a main component of plastic welding adhesives, it is also used extensively by model building hobbyists for joining plastic components together. It is commonly referred to as "Di-clo."

It is used in the garment printing industry for removal of heat-sealed garment transfers.

DCM is used in the material testing field of civil engineering; specifically it is used during the testing of bituminous materials as a solvent to separate the binder from the aggregate of an asphalt or macadam to allow the testing of the materials.

Dichloromethane extract of Asparagopsis taxiformis, a seaweed fodder for cattle, has been found to reduce their methane emissions by 79%.

It has been used as the principal component of paint stripper, but its use for this purpose is now prohibited in the United States and the European Union.

Chemical reactions
Dichloromethane is widely used as a solvent in part because it is relatively inert.  It does participate in reactions with certain strong nucleophiles however.  Tert-butyllithium deprotonates DCM:

Methyllithium reacts with methylene chloride to give chlorocarbene (CHCl).

Toxicity
Even though DCM is the least toxic of the simple chlorohydrocarbons, it has serious health risks. Its high volatility makes it an acute inhalation hazard. It can also be absorbed through the skin. 
Symptoms of acute overexposure to dichloromethane via inhalation include difficulty concentrating, dizziness, fatigue, nausea, headaches, numbness, weakness, and irritation of the upper respiratory tract and eyes. More severe consequences can include suffocation, loss of consciousness, coma, and death.

DCM is also metabolized by the body to carbon monoxide potentially leading to carbon monoxide poisoning. Acute exposure by inhalation has resulted in optic neuropathy and hepatitis. Prolonged skin contact can result in DCM dissolving some of the fatty tissues in skin, resulting in skin irritation or chemical burns.

It may be carcinogenic, as it has been linked to cancer of the lungs, liver, and pancreas in laboratory animals. Other animal studies showed breast cancer and salivary gland cancer. Research is not yet clear as to what levels may be carcinogenic. DCM crosses the placenta but fetal toxicity in women who are exposed to it during pregnancy has not been proven. In animal experiments, it was fetotoxic at doses that were maternally toxic but no teratogenic effects were seen.

In people with pre-existing heart problems, exposure to DCM can cause abnormal heart rhythms and/or heart attacks, sometimes without any other symptoms of overexposure. People with existing liver, nervous system, or skin problems may worsen after exposure to methylene chloride.

Regulation
In many countries, products containing DCM must carry labels warning of its health risks.

In February 2013, the U.S. Occupational Safety and Health Administration (OSHA) and the National Institute for Occupational Safety and Health warned that at least 14 bathtub refinishers have died since 2000 from DCM exposure. These workers had been working alone, in poorly ventilated bathrooms, with inadequate or no respiratory protection, and no training about the hazards of DCM. OSHA has since then issued a DCM standard.
In the European Union, the European Parliament voted in 2009 to ban the use of DCM in paint-strippers for consumers and many professionals. The ban took effect in December 2010.

In Europe, the Scientific Committee on Occupational Exposure Limit Values (SCOEL) recommends for DCM an occupational exposure limit (8 h time-weighted average) of 100 ppm and a short-term exposure limit (15 min) of 200 ppm.

Concerns about its health effects have led to a search for alternatives in many of these applications.

On March 15, 2019, the U.S. Environmental Protection Agency (EPA) issued a final rule to prohibit the manufacture (including importing and exporting), processing, and distribution of methylene chloride in all paint removers for consumer use, effective in 180 days. However, it does not affect other products containing methylene chloride, including many consumer products not intended for paint removal.

Environmental effects

Ozone

Dichloromethane is not classified as an ozone-depleting substance by the Montreal Protocol.  The U.S. Clean Air Act does not regulate dichloromethane as an ozone depleter.  Recent research shows that dichloromethane and other halogenated very short-lived substances (VSLSs), despite their short atmospheric lifetimes of less than 0.5 year, can contribute to stratospheric ozone depletion, particularly if emitted in regions where rapid transport to the stratosphere occurs.  Atmospheric abundances of dichloromethane have been increasing in recent years.

Ozone concentrations measured at the midlatitudes from the ground up through the stratosphere from 1998 to 2016 have declined by 2.2 Dobson units, just under 1%. The reasons for this decline are unclear, but one unverified hypothesis is the presence of short-lived substances such as dichloromethane in the lower atmosphere.

See also
Chloromethane
Trichloromethane
Tetrachloromethane 
List of organic compounds
Carbon monoxide-releasing molecules

References

External links

 
 
 National Pollutant Inventory – Dichloromethane Fact Sheet
 Dichloromethane at National Toxicology Program
 IARC Summaries & Evaluations Vol. 71 (1999)
 Canadian Environmental Protection Act Priority Substances List Assessment Report
Organic Compounds Database
Sustainable uses and Industry recommendations

Chloroalkanes
Halomethanes
Aerosol propellants
Hazardous air pollutants
Refrigerants
Halogenated solvents
IARC Group 2A carcinogens
Fetotoxicants
Testicular toxicants
Halogen-containing natural products
GABAA receptor positive allosteric modulators
Sweet-smelling chemicals
Ozone depletion